Orlindo Ayoví Caicedo (born September 15, 1984) is an Ecuadorian footballer currently playing as a striker for Social Sol.

He previously played in Ecuadorian football for L.D.U. Quito (2004 and 2007), Macará (2005), Imbabura (2006 and 2011), Deportivo Azogues (2008), El Nacional (2009), ESPOLI (2010), L.D.U. Portoviejo (2010), Olmedo (2012), Independiente del Valle (2013) and Mushuc Runa (2014), for Argentine club Atlético de Rafaela (2007), and for Mexican club Irapuato (2013).

External links
 Profile at BDFA 
 Profile at Goal 
 

1984 births
Living people
Ecuadorian footballers
Ecuadorian expatriate footballers
L.D.U. Quito footballers
C.S.D. Macará footballers
Imbabura S.C. footballers
Atlético de Rafaela footballers
Deportivo Azogues footballers
C.D. El Nacional footballers
C.D. ESPOLI footballers
L.D.U. Portoviejo footballers
C.D. Olmedo footballers
Irapuato F.C. footballers
C.S.D. Independiente del Valle footballers
Mushuc Runa S.C. footballers
C.D. Social Sol players
Ecuadorian Serie A players
Expatriate footballers in Argentina
Expatriate footballers in Mexico
Expatriate footballers in Honduras
People from Eloy Alfaro Canton
Association football forwards